Tripp County Veteran's Memorial, at 200 E. Third St. in Winner, South Dakota, was erected in 1924.  It was listed on the National Register of Historic Places in 2009.

It is located on the south side of the Tripp County Courthouse.

The bronze represents a World War I doughboy carrying a rifle and with a raised arm, as if leading in a charge.

Gallery

References

Monuments and memorials on the National Register of Historic Places in South Dakota
World War I memorials in the United States
National Register of Historic Places in Tripp County, South Dakota
Buildings and structures completed in 1924